Patrik Flašar (born April 4, 1987) is a Czech professional ice hockey defenceman. He played with HC Vítkovice in the Czech Extraliga during the 2010–11 Czech Extraliga season.

Career statistics

References

External links

1987 births
Czech ice hockey defencemen
HC Havířov players
HC Vrchlabí players
JKH GKS Jastrzębie players
LHK Jestřábi Prostějov players
Living people
MHK Kežmarok players
Stadion Hradec Králové players
TH Unia Oświęcim players
TMH Polonia Bytom players
Czech expatriate ice hockey players in Germany
Czech expatriate ice hockey players in Slovakia
Slovak expatriate sportspeople in Poland
Expatriate ice hockey players in Poland